Kreuttal is a town in the district of Mistelbach in the Austrian state of Lower Austria.

The town is split into 4 localities (Ortschaft) (number of inhabitants in parentheses, October 2011): Hautzendorf (540), Hornsburg (183),  Ritzendorf (25) and Unterolberndorf (673). The town council has 19 members and is made up of ÖVP (12), SPÖ (4) and the Austrian Green Party (3).

Population

References

Cities and towns in Mistelbach District